Sally Anna Stepanek (July 1, 1960 – October 6, 2019) was an American poet. She graduated from the Iowa Writer's Workshop with an M.F.A. and from the University of Houston with a Ph.D. Stepanek taught at Wheaton College.

She was on a panel at the 2007 Association of Writers & Writing Programs. Stepanek won the 2005 National Poetry Series award.

Awards
 2005 National Poetry Series, for Three, Breathing selected by Mary Ruefle

Works

References

External links
S.A. Stepanek's author page at Wave Books
"Barbara Duffey reviews S. A. Stepanek’s Three, Breathing", American Book Review, March/April 2007
"S. A. Stepanek's Three, Breathing, reviewed by Brandon Lamson", Gulf Coast

1960 births
2019 deaths
University of Houston alumni
Iowa Writers' Workshop alumni
Wheaton College (Illinois) faculty
American women poets
American women academics
21st-century American women